John Pointz or Poyntz may refer to:

John Poyntz (c.1485–1544), courtier and politician
John Morice (1568-1618) later Sir John Poyntz, MP for Appleby and Chamberlain of the Exchequer
John Pointz, (died 1633), English landowner and politician who sat in the House of Commons in 1593
John Pointz (MP for Gloucestershire), MP for Gloucestershire (UK Parliament constituency) 1368–1372

See also